Wings of the Morning is a 1919 American silent drama film directed by J. Gordon Edwards and starring William Farnum, Herschel Mayall, Frank Elliott, G. Raymond Nye, Clarence Burton, and Harry De Vere. It is based on the 1903 novel by Louis Tracy. The film was released by Fox Film Corporation on November 24, 1919.

Plot

Cast
William Farnum as Capt. Robert Anstruther
Herschel Mayall as Col. Costabel
Frank Elliott as Lord Ventnor
G. Raymond Nye as Mir Jan
Clarence Burton as Taung Si Ali
Harry De Vere as Sir Arthur Deane
Louise Lovely as Iris Deane
Genevieve Blinn as Lady Costabel

Preservation
Wings of the Morning is now considered to be a lost film.

References

External links

1919 drama films
Fox Film films
Silent American drama films
1919 films
American silent feature films
American black-and-white films
Lost American films
Films based on British novels
1919 lost films
Lost drama films
1910s American films